"Parallel Line" is a song recorded by New Zealand-born Australian country music artist Keith Urban. It was released on 18 January 2018 as a single from his 2018 album Graffiti U.

Critical reception
Stephen L. Betts from Rolling Stone said: "Reminiscent of a Nineties slow jam, in a contemporary Ed Sheeran-style glorious chorus and hook, but uninspiring disjointed verses in between. The tune spotlights Urban singing the verses in a higher register and giving the pleading lyrics a keener sense of urgency."

Charts

Certifications

References

2018 singles
2017 songs
Keith Urban songs
Capitol Records Nashville singles
Songs written by Ed Sheeran
Songs written by Benny Blanco
Songs written by Johnny McDaid
Songs written by Amy Wadge
Songs written by Julia Michaels
Song recordings produced by Benny Blanco
Songs written by Tor Erik Hermansen
Songs written by Mikkel Storleer Eriksen